Piano Sonata in C minor may refer to:

 Piano Sonata No. 5 (Beethoven)
 Piano Sonata No. 8 (Beethoven)
 Piano Sonata No. 32 (Beethoven)
 Piano Sonata No. 1 (Chopin)
 Piano Sonata Hob. XVI/20 (Haydn)
 Piano Sonata No. 14 (Mozart)
 Piano Sonata No. 4 (Prokofiev)
 Piano Sonata D. 958 (Schubert)